Stevan Račić (born on 17 January 1984) is a Serbian professional footballer who plays as a forward for the club where he started his career, FK Hercegovac Gajdobra. He has played with several Eastern European and Asian clubs during his career.

Club career
Born in Bačka Palanka, Račić played in a number of minor and medium size clubs in Serbia before arriving in Ivanjica in January 2006 to play with local club FK Javor Ivanjica, having won with them promotion to the Serbian SuperLiga in 2008. After having played his first season in the top league, he received a proposal from South Korean club Daejeon Citizen F.C. to move to the K-League in summer of 2009. After playing the rest of the season in the far-east, in January 2010 he returned to his previous club, FK Javor, where he will play the rest of the 2009-10 season, and help them reach a European spot in the SuperLiga.

During 2011 he was playing with Liga Primer Indonesia club Solo FC before returning in summer 2011 to Serbia to play with SuperLiga club FK Jagodina.

Čelik Nikšić
After one season playing in the Serbian First League, he moved to Montenegrin First League team FK Čelik Nikšić. On August 26, 2012, Račić scored the fastest goal in the history of the Montenegrin First League against Mladost Podgorica only 12.25 seconds into the game's duration.

Partizani Tirana
In June 2014, Račić joined Albanian side Partizani Tirana where he signed a contract until the end of the season. During his presentation, Račić said that he had offers from Montenegro, but he chose Albania as his next destination for his career. After summer transfer window was closed, Partizani had made 32 transferts, a record in Albanian football.

2014–15 season
On 24 August 2014, Račić made his Partizani Tirana debut in the opening match of 2014–15 Albanian Superliga against Laçi, where he scored the only goal of his team in a 1–1 draw. On 11 September 2014, he won a 90th-minute penalty kick against title rivals Skënderbeu Korçë that successfully converted by Emiljano Vila. Thanks to that, Partizani was able to win 1–0 at Qemal Stafa Stadium to receive the first win of the season after a draw against Laçi and a loss against Apolonia Fier.

On 14 September, Račić scored his second goal of the season, an 88th-minute free kick, to help Partizani prevail 0–1 against Kukësi at Zeqir Ymeri Stadium. Five days later, in the 4th week match against Teuta Durrës, Račić scored his third league goal and also set-up the Astrit Fazliu goal in an eventual 2–0 home win. That was the club's third consecutive league win. Six days later, Račić played in Tirana derby I against fierce local rivals Tirana which ended in a goalless draw. At the end of the month, Račić was named Albanian Superliga Player of the Month for September.

He continued with his solid appearances by scoring the only goal in the 9th league match against Elbasani, where he also won a penalty-kick, missed by Emiljano Vila. He ended the first phrase of the league with four goals in nine appearances, with Partizani who finished it with 18 points, tied with Tirana on top. After the match, asked for insultsis of fans against his country Serbia, Račić said: "I felt a little bad, but I know they were not against me. They are the best fans in Albanian Superliga and they have always supported us, like when we play at home, and where we play away."

2015–16 season
On 15 June 2015, Račić agreed a contract extension with Partizani Tirana, with the new deal expiring on 30 June 2016. On 14 March of the following year, in the match against the league contenders of Skënderbeu Korçë, Račić scored the opening goal in the 20th minute, and also missed a penalty-kick in the second half, in an eventual 1–1 home draw as the "Demat e kuq" missed the opportunity to reduce the gap against them in the title race. He was, however, praised for his performance during the match.

Bačka
In July 2017, Račić completed a transfer to Serbian SuperLiga side OFK Bačka. He started the season on 22 July by playing the first half of the 2–1 away loss to Spartak Subotica in the first championship match. After five matches without scoring, Račić terminated his contract in order to return to Albania where he was a target of several top flight clubs.

Kamza
On 1 September 2017, Račić returned to Albania by signing a one-year contract with newly promoted top flight side Kamza. He made his competitive debut with the team 8 days later in the opening match against Kukësi which finished in a 1–0 away loss. He opened his scoring account on 13 September by netting in the 0–2 win over Iliria Fushë-Krujë in the first leg of 2017–18 Albanian Cup. Kamza eventually progressed to the next round by winning 7–1 on aggregate. His first score-sheet contributions in league came on matchday 4 where he netted a penalty kick against Teuta Durrës to rescue his team a point. Eleven days later against Luftëtari Gjirokastër, Račić scored a brace, including a last-minute penalty, to give Kamza their first league win. He won the penalty after he was punched in the stomach by Luftëtari's goalkeeper Festim Miraka, who received a red card.

On 2 December, in the match against Teuta Durrës, Račić scored the lone goal of the match, a volley from outside the zone which past goalkeeper and put Kamza temporarily on second place for the first time.

Career statistics

Honours

Club
Čelik Nikšić
Montenegrin Cup: Runner-up 2012–13

Individual
Albanian Superliga Player of the Month: September 2014

References

External links
 Profile at Srbijafudbal.
 

1984 births
Living people
People from Bačka Palanka
Serbian footballers
Serbian expatriate footballers
Association football forwards
RFK Novi Sad 1921 players
FK ČSK Čelarevo players
FK Obilić players
FK Javor Ivanjica players
FK Jagodina players
OFK Bačka players
Serbian First League players
Serbian SuperLiga players
Kategoria Superiore players
Daejeon Hana Citizen FC players
FC Volyn Lutsk players
FK Partizani Tirana players
FC Kamza players
Ukrainian Premier League players
K League 1 players
Expatriate footballers in South Korea
Expatriate footballers in Indonesia
Expatriate footballers in Ukraine
Expatriate footballers in Albania
Serbian expatriate sportspeople in South Korea
Serbian expatriate sportspeople in Albania
Expatriate footballers in Malta
Serbian expatriate sportspeople in Malta
Pembroke Athleta F.C. players